Lucca Sesano (born 29 September 2002) is an Argentine professional footballer who plays as a central midfielder for All Boys.

Career
Sesano came through the youth ranks at All Boys, having joined in 2012. He was promoted into the first-team squad under manager José Santos Romero in late-2020, with the central midfielder initially featuring in the club's pre-season friendlies ahead of the 2020 Primera B Nacional campaign; notably scoring against Lanús Reserves on 16 October. In the following month, on 28 November, Sesano made his senior debut in a goalless draw away to Brown in Primera B Nacional; appearing for the full duration.

Career statistics
.

References

External links

2002 births
Living people
Place of birth missing (living people)
Argentine footballers
Association football midfielders
Primera Nacional players
All Boys footballers